The 1958 NCAA Golf Championship was the 20th annual NCAA-sanctioned golf tournament to determine the individual and team national champions of men's collegiate golf in the United States.

The tournament was held at Taconic Golf Club in Williamstown, Massachusetts, hosted by Williams College.

Two-time defending champions Houston won the team title, the Cougars' third NCAA team national title.

Individual results

Individual champion
 Phil Rodgers, Houston

Tournament medalists
 Phil Rodgers, Houston (139)
 Ab Justice, Oklahoma State (139)

Team results

Note: Top 10 only
DC = Defending champions

References

NCAA Golf Championship
NCAA Golf Championship
NCAA Golf Championship
Golf in Massachusetts
History of Berkshire County, Massachusetts
NCAA Men's Golf Championship
Sports competitions in Massachusetts
Tourist attractions in Berkshire County, Massachusetts
Williamstown, Massachusetts